There have been two British Columbian/Canadian banks with the name Bank of British Columbia.

The first bank: 1862–1901 
The first was established by Royal Charter in 1862, with its head office in London. Between 1862 and 1871 it issued dollar banknotes. By 1885 it had branches in San Francisco, Portland, Oregon (est. 1866), Victoria, British Columbia (est. 1862) and New Westminster (est. 1862). In 1889 it established a branch in Seattle. In 1901 it merged with the Canadian Bank of Commerce. At the time of the merger it had branches in Vancouver (est. 1886), Victoria, Kamloops, Nanaimo, Nelson, New Westminster, Rossland, Sandon, San Francisco, Portland, and London.

Banknotes

There remains $48,797 in outstanding banknotes from the bank of British Columbia, in $1, $5, $10, $20 and $50 denominations.  The bills were issued from 1863 to 1894 and in the 1970s they brought anywhere from $500 to $1,500 per bill on the collector's market.

Architecture
The Bank of British Columbia in Victoria, British Columbia was built in 1885 and was designated as a heritage site by the City of Victoria in 1975. The Bank of British Columbia in Vancouver, British Columbia, was built in 1889 to 1891 and was added to Vancouver's Community Heritage Register in 1986.

The second bank: 1966–1986
The second bank was chartered in 1966 with headquarters in Vancouver and was the creation of W.A.C. Bennett, the Premier of British Columbia. Bennett, a businessman, wanted to end Central Canada's control over the banking industry which obliged all but the smaller loans for companies in British Columbia to receive authorization from head offices in either Montreal or Toronto.

In 1986, the bank had 1,410 employees, 41 branches in BC and Alberta, and offices in the Cayman Islands, the US, and Hong Kong. Assets in 1986 were CAD$2.7 billion, which put the bank 27th among banks and financial institutions in Canada. Revenue in 1986 was $324 million.

Following financial difficulties arising from the decline of the western oil economy, the collapses of Canadian Commercial Bank and Northland Bank had a serious impact on other institutions that depended on wholesale deposit funding. Like the many Trust Companies and Credit Union amalgamations in 1986, the Canadian government permitted the Hongkong Bank of Canada (HSBC) to rescue it. By stepping in, HSBC acquired a large base of stable retail deposits. The acquisition immediately raised HSBC's ranking amongst Canadian banks from the 20th to the 9th largest.

See also

List of Canadian banks
Canada Deposit Insurance Corporation
Canadian chartered bank notes

Citations

References
 1986 Bank of British Columbia Business Continuation Act. From the Department of Justice
Barlee, Neville Langrell (1976)  Historic Treasures and lost mines of British Columbia. (Canada West Publications).

Economy of British Columbia
Defunct banks of Canada
Banks established in 1862 
1862 establishments in the British Empire
Banks disestablished in 1901 
1901 disestablishments in Canada
Banks established in 1966 
1966 establishments in British Columbia
Banks disestablished in 1986 
1986 disestablishments in British Columbia
HSBC acquisitions
Bank failures
1901 mergers and acquisitions
Canadian companies disestablished in 1986
Canadian companies established in 1966
Canadian companies established in 1862